The Oval is a commercial high-rise building in Limassol, Cyprus. It was completed in February 2017 and opened in April 2017.

It was designed by Hakim Khennouchi, lead designer, whilst working at Atkins, he went on to complete the post concept design stages with WKK Architects. Armeftis Associates design offices acted as the local architect. The project was developed and constructed by Cybarco (Lanitis Group). Due to its complex geometrical shape, the project was put through an advanced computational framework which was purposely built to support multiple levels and disciplines of design, construction and digital fabrication. The Doubly Curved Shell is constructed of a Reinforced Concrete structure in combination with a steel frame and it is clad with around 10,000 different CNC fabricated aluminium panels.

See also 
 List of tallest buildings in Cyprus
 Tower 25

References

Buildings and structures in Limassol
Office buildings completed in 2017